Ballad of a White Cow (romanized: Ghasideyeh gave sefid) is a 2020 Iranian drama film co-directed by Behtash Sanaeeha and Maryam Moqadam, and co-written by Sanaeeha, Moqadam, and Mehrdad Kouroshniya.

The film had its worldwide premiere at the 38th Fajr Film Festival. It also showed at 71st Berlin International Film Festival in March 2021. This film was also nominated for New Talent Award at the Hong Kong Asian Film Festival 2021.

Plot

Mina's life is turned upside down when she learns that her husband was innocent of the crime for which he was executed.

Cast

 Maryam Moqadam as Mina
 Alireza Sani Far as Reza
 Pouria Rahimi as Babak's brother
 Farid Ghobadi as Reza's Colleague
 Lili Farhadpour as Mina's Neighbor
 Avin Poor Raoufi as Bita (Mina's daughter)

Release
On February 11, 2021, Berlinale announced that the film would have its worldwide premiere at the 71st Berlin International Film Festival in the Berlinale Competition section, in March 2021.

Reception

Awards and nominations

References

External links
 
 
 

2020 films
2020 drama films
Iranian drama films